Vietnam competed at the 2004 Summer Olympics in Athens, Greece from 13 to 29 August 2004.

Athletics 

Vietnamese athletes have so far achieved qualifying standards in the following athletics events (up to a maximum of 3 athletes in each event at the 'A' Standard, and 1 at the 'B' Standard).

Men

Women

Canoeing

Sprint

Qualification Legend: Q = Qualify to final; q = Qualify to semifinal

Rowing

Women

Qualification Legend: FA=Final A (medal); FB=Final B (non-medal); FC=Final C (non-medal); FD=Final D (non-medal); FE=Final E (non-medal); FF=Final F (non-medal); SA/B=Semifinals A/B; SC/D=Semifinals C/D; SE/F=Semifinals E/F; R=Repechage

Shooting 

Men

Swimming 

Men

Table tennis

Men

Taekwondo

Vietnam has qualified two taekwondo practitioners in their respective divisions.

Weightlifting 

Vietnam has qualified a single weightlifter.

See also
 Vietnam at the 2002 Asian Games
 Vietnam at the 2004 Summer Paralympics
 Vietnam at the 2006 Asian Games

References

External links
Official Report of the XXVIII Olympiad
Vietnam Olympic Committee 

Nations at the 2004 Summer Olympics
2004
2004 in Vietnamese sport